The Women's junior road race of the 2015 UCI Road World Championships took place in and around Richmond, Virginia, United States on September 25, 2015.

As they did in the time trial event, American duo Chloé Dygert and Emma White finished with the gold and silver medals respectively. Dygert won the race by 83 seconds over White, to become the first rider since Nicole Cooke in 2001 to win both junior titles in the same year. The podium was completed by Poland's Agnieszka Skalniak, a further five seconds in arrears.

Qualification

All National Federations were allowed to enter eight riders for the race, with a maximum of four riders to start. In addition to this number, the outgoing World Champion and the current continental champions were also able to take part. The outgoing World Champion, Amalie Dideriksen, did not compete as she was no longer eligible to contest junior races.

Course

The junior women rode four laps on the road race circuit. All road races took place on a challenging, technical and inner-city road circuit. The circuit headed west from Downtown Richmond, working its way onto Monument Avenue, a paver-lined, historic boulevard that's been named one of the "10 Great Streets in America". Cyclists took a 180-degree turn at the Jefferson Davis monument and then maneuvered through the Uptown district and Virginia Commonwealth University. Halfway through the circuit, the race headed down into Shockoe Bottom before following the canal and passing Great Shiplock Park, the start of the Virginia Capital Trail. A sharp, off-camber turn at Rocketts Landing brought the riders to the narrow, twisty, cobbled  climb up to Libby Hill Park in the historic Church Hill neighborhood. A quick descent, followed by three hard turns led to a  climb up 23rd Street. Once atop this steep cobbled hill, riders descended into Shockoe Bottom. This led them to the final  climb on Governor Street. At the top, the rider had to take a sharp left turn onto the false-flat finishing straight,  to the finish.

Schedule
All times are in Eastern Daylight Time (UTC−4).

Participating nations
74 cyclists from 28 nations took part in the women's junior road race. The numbers of cyclists per nation is shown in parentheses.

 
 
 
 
 
 
 
 
 
 
 
 
 
 
 
 
 
 
 
 
 
 
 
 
 
 
  (host)

Prize money
The UCI assigned premiums for the top 3 finishers with a total prize money of €3,450.

Final classification

References

Women's junior road race
UCI Road World Championships – Women's junior road race
2015 in women's road cycling